Gonzalo Vargas Abella (born 22 September 1981) is a Uruguayan former football striker. He last played for Rampla Juniors.

Vargas is nicknamed Turbo because of his explosive dribbles and high speed sprints.

Career

Club
He also played for Defensor Sporting (2002–2004) and the Argentine team Gimnasia y Esgrima La Plata (2005–2006). 
On 31 August 2007, Vargas signed for FC Sochaux-Montbéliard on loan from AS Monaco. On June 23, 2008, he was presented as the new forward for F.C. Atlas, following Bruno Marioni's departure from the club. He was given the number 9 jersey.

Vargas returned to Argentina to play for Argentinos Juniors on loan for the 2010-11 Argentine Primera División season.

National team
He has been capped by the Uruguay national side 10 times, and he has scored 3 goals.

International goals

|-
|1||May 23, 2006||Memorial Coliseum, Los Angeles||||1–0||2–0 (W)||Friendly
|-
|2||May 23, 2006||Memorial Coliseum, Los Angeles||||2–0||2–0 (W)||Friendly
|-
|3||February 6, 2007||Estadio General Santander, Cúcuta||||3–0||3–1 (W)||Friendly
|-
|}

References

External links
 
 
 
 Argentine Primera statistics at Fútbol XXI 

1981 births
Living people
Uruguayan footballers
Uruguayan Primera División players
Argentine Primera División players
Ligue 1 players
Liga MX players
Defensor Sporting players
Club de Gimnasia y Esgrima La Plata footballers
C.A. Bella Vista players
Argentinos Juniors footballers
AS Monaco FC players
FC Sochaux-Montbéliard players
Atlas F.C. footballers
Uruguay international footballers
2007 Copa América players
Expatriate footballers in Argentina
Expatriate footballers in France
Expatriate footballers in Monaco
Expatriate footballers in Mexico
Uruguayan expatriate footballers
Association football forwards
Footballers from Montevideo
Uruguayan expatriate sportspeople in Monaco